New Covenant Christian School (NCCS) is a private Christian school located in Lansing, Michigan United States. Their address is 4415 W. St. Joseph Hwy. Lansing, MI  48917 The school was founded in 1984, and has currently about 150 co-ed Kindergarten through 12th grade students.

Academics
New Covenant provides classes like World and US history, Algebra 1 and 2, Geometry, advanced math, Physical Science, Physics, Biology, and fine arts. The curriculum is Bible-based and in the secondary students have evidential and relational apologetics. As a classical school, students also take Logic, Rhetoric 1, Rhetoric 2, Junior Thesis, and Senior Thesis with a classically-informed reading list for all Literature classes. 

Great Schools students' parent reviews gave New Covenant Christian School a 41/2 star rating.

School clubs and school organizations
Worship team: On Wednesdays some students sing/play contemporary worship music in front of the school body.

References

1984 establishments in Michigan
Christian schools in Michigan
Private elementary schools in Michigan
Private high schools in Michigan
Private middle schools in Michigan